
Lac des Taillères is a lake in the la Brévine valley in the Canton of Neuchâtel, Switzerland.

See also
List of lakes of Switzerland
List of mountain lakes of Switzerland

External links

Lakes of Switzerland
Lakes of the canton of Neuchâtel
L Lac des Tailleres